The Volunteer Ribbon is an Israeli decoration that is awarded to World War I and World War II veterans.

Award criteria 
The ribbon is awarded to:

 All those who during the World War I volunteered to the World War I Batalion. 

 An Israeli citizen or a permanent resident of Israel who, or those who during permanent residency in Palestine volunteered during the World War I, to serve in the Turkish army according to the needs of the Yishuv's (the national Jewish institutions).

 Israeli citizens or permanent residents of Israel who volunteered for the British army during the World War II before 8/11/1944. If they volunteered in 8/11/1944 or later, the condition is that they served for six consecutive months or more. 

 Citizens who volunteered during the Second World War are eligible for the Nazi Fighter ribbon for their engagement.  

If the person eligible for this award has died, a family member (a spouse, a son, a daughter, a father, a mother, a brother, a sister, a grandson, a granddaughter) is entitled to submit an application requesting the ribbon, or an equivalent to the ribbon in event of loss or wear and tear.

Design 
Ribbon

The ribbon's central stripe shows the flag of Israel with red, orange and green stripes on either side.

See also 

 List of military awards of World War II
Israeli military decorations
War of Independence Ribbon
 Fighters against Nazis Medal

References 

Military awards and decorations of Israel
Campaign medals